Charles Henry Langtree (23 April 1883 — 3 August 1916) was an Australian rules footballer who played with Collingwood in the Victorian Football League (VFL).

He was wounded in World War I while serving with the British Army, and later died of his injuries.

Family
The son of Charles William Langtree (1848-1899), and Jeannie Langtree (-1915), née McCracken, Charles Henry Langtree was born at Moonee Ponds, Victoria on 23 April 1883. He was the grandson of Alexander McCracken (1856-1915), the first president of the VFL.

He grew up on the family property, "Ulundi", at Warrenbayne in north-eastern Victoria.

Education
He was educated at Haileybury College, where he excelled at both cricket and football, and at Dookie College.

Football
Langtree "attended Dookie College before being recruited to Collingwood as 'an old boy' from Haileybury College".

Having played for a Collingwood team a week earlier (21 July 1900) in a match against a Bright District team, he played his only senior VFL game, at the age of 17, against St Kilda at the Junction Oval on 28 July 1900.

He enlisted in the British Army in World War I, and served in the 159th Brigade Royal Field Artillery with the rank of Lieutenant.

Death
He died of wounds sustained in action (in the Battle of the Somme) on 3 August 1916.

He is buried at Corbie Communal Cemetery Extension, in Corbie, France.

His name is recorded on the Warrenbayne War Memorial.

See also
 List of Victorian Football League players who died in active service

Footnotes

References

 Holmesby, Russell & Main, Jim (2007). The Encyclopedia of AFL Footballers. 7th ed. Melbourne: Bas Publishing.
 Main, J. & Allen, D., "Langtree, Charles", pp. 96–97 in Main, J. & Allen, D., Fallen – The Ultimate Heroes: Footballers Who Never Returned From War, Crown Content, (Melbourne), 2002. 
 "73. Lieutenant Charles Henry Langtree", p.13 in Batchelder, A,, Melbourne Cricket Club Roll of Honour 1914-1918, Melbourne Cricket Club.
 Commemorative Roll: Lieutenant Charles Henry Langtree, Australian War Memorial.

External links
 
 
 Charles Langtree, at Collingwood Forever.
 Lieutenant Charles Henry Langtree, at Commonwealth War Graves Commission.

1883 births
1916 deaths
People educated at Haileybury (Melbourne)
Australian rules footballers from Victoria (Australia)
Collingwood Football Club players
British Army personnel of World War I
Royal Field Artillery officers
British military personnel killed in the Battle of the Somme
Burials in Hauts-de-France
Military personnel from Melbourne
People from Moonee Ponds, Victoria